2022–23 UAE Division One is the 46th Division one season. This seasons will expand the league from 15 to 17 teams as more teams from UAE Second Division League got promoted to the league.

Team Changes

To Division 1 
Relegated from UAE Pro League
Al Urooba
Emirates

Promoted from UAE Division 2
Al Fursan
Baynounah

From Division 1 
Promoted to UAE Pro League
Dibba Al Fujairah
Al Bataeh

Stadia and locations

Note: Table lists clubs in alphabetical order.

Personnel and kits

Note: Flags indicate national team as has been defined under FIFA eligibility rules. Players may hold more than one non-FIFA nationality.

 Foreign players 
All teams could register as many foreign players as they want, but could only use two on the field each game.

Players name in bold indicates the player is registered during the mid-season transfer window.
Players in italics'' were out of the squad or left the club within the season, after the pre-season transfer window, or in the mid-season transfer window, and at least had one appearance.

Managerial changes

League table

Results

Number of teams by Emirates

Season statistics

Top Goal Scorers

References

2022–23 in Emirati football